"The Grease Megamix" is a megamix released in 1990 to commemorate the video release of Grease. The single was credited to John Travolta and Olivia Newton-John and released via Polydor Records. It was created by Phil Harding and Ian Curnow for PWL by the request of Polydor Records, who supplied copies of the original multi-track recordings. The megamix topped the charts of Australia and Spain and became a top-five hit in Denmark, Ireland, the Netherlands, Norway, and the United Kingdom.

Reception
The megamix featured the three biggest hits from the Grease soundtrack: "You're the One That I Want", "Greased Lightnin'" and "Summer Nights". The song peaked at number one in Australia and remained there for five weeks in May 1991. It was the third-highest-selling single there in 1991.

Re-release
"The Grease Megamix" was re-released on the 1996 compilation CD Pure Disco.  To promote the compilation, Polydor issued promotional CD singles of the Megamix to US radio stations, which propelled it to number 12 in airplay.  The single was not released commercially in the US, which made it ineligible to chart on the Billboard Hot 100; it did reach the top 40 on three of Billboard's radio format airplay charts.

The megamix re-emerged for the 20th Anniversary celebrations of the Grease movie in 1998. The Grease (The Remix EP) featured the megamix, a remix of "You're the One That I Want", a remix of "Summer Nights'", and the original versions of both songs.

Track listings
7-inch and cassette single
 "The Grease Megamix"
 "Alone at the Drive-in-Movie" (instrumental)

12-inch single
A1. "The Grease Megamix"
B1. "Alone at the Drive-in-Movie" (instrumental)
B2. "Love Is a Many Splendored Thing" (instrumental)

CD single
 "The Grease Megamix" (7-inch version)
 "The Grease Megamix" (12-inch version)
 "Alone at the Drive-in-Movie" (instrumental)

Charts and certifications

Weekly charts

Year-end charts

Certifications

References

External links
 pwlfromthefactoryfloor.com - Official Website of Phil Harding's Book - PWL From The Factory Floor - Expanded Edition and CD: Phil Harding Club Mixes of the 80s
 
 http://www.discogs.com/John-Travolta-Olivia-Newton-John-The-Grease-Megamix/release/1777953

John Travolta songs
Olivia Newton-John songs
1990 singles
Music medleys
Number-one singles in Australia
Number-one singles in Spain
Songs from Grease (musical)
Songs written by Jim Jacobs
Songs written by John Farrar
Songs written by Warren Casey